Magadh division is an administrative geographical unit of Bihar state of India. Gaya is the administrative headquarters of the division.  Currently (2005), the division consists Gaya district, Nawada district, Aurangabad district, Jehanabad district, and Arwal district. The current divisional commissioner is Shri Sri Mayank Warwade, an IAS officer of 2001 batch of Bihar cadre. Magadh is home to the Magahi culture. People speak Magahi language here.

Districts, Sub-divisions, and Blocks

See also

Divisions of Bihar
Districts of Bihar

References

 
Divisions of Bihar